Clément Richard (17 February 1939 – 3 March 2022) was a Canadian lawyer, businessman and politician in Quebec. He represented Montmorency in the Quebec National Assembly as a member of the Parti Québécois from 1976 to 1985.

He was born in Quebec City, the son of J. Damase Richard and Léontine Bégin, and was educated at the Collège Saint-Jean-Eudes, the Collège Saint-Louis in Edmundston, the Université Laval and Georgetown University. He was a reporter for L'Action de Québec and then taught Canadian history at the Académie de Québec from 1963 to 1967. Richard was called to the Quebec bar in 1965. He ran unsuccessfully for a seat in the Quebec assembly in 1973, losing to Marcel Bédard. Richard served as President of the National Assembly from 1976 to 1980. He was a member of the Quebec cabinet, serving as Minister of Communications from 1980 to 1981 and Minister of Cultural Affairs from 1981 to 1985. Richard did not run for reelection in 1985. He was a vice-president for Lavalin and then president/director general for Lavalin Communications from 1986 to 1991. Richard was president and founder of MétéoMédia, Expotech Imax and the Quebec book publishing company Mondia. He served on the administrative council for Place des Arts, serving as president of the council from 1995 to 2002, and was also a member of the executive committee for the Musée des beaux-arts de Montréal.

Richard died on 3 March 2022, at the age of 83.

Electoral record

References

Sources 
 

1939 births
2022 deaths
Lawyers in Quebec
French Quebecers
Parti Québécois MNAs
Politicians from Quebec City
Presidents of the National Assembly of Quebec
Journalists from Quebec
Officers of the National Order of Quebec
Université Laval alumni